, known in North America as simply Worldwide Soccer '98 and in Europe as Sega Worldwide Soccer '98 Club Edition, is a video game developed and published by Sega for the Sega Saturn in 1997 and Windows in 1998. It is the third game in its series, following Victory Goal and Sega Worldwide Soccer 97.

Development
Sega Worldwide Soccer '98 used the same game engine as its predecessor, Sega Worldwide Soccer '97. Cobi Jones played an advisory role in the game's development and served as its spokesperson. Commentary was provided by Gary Bloom (known for his appearances on Football Italia) and Jack Charlton.

Reception

The game received mixed reviews; most critics wrote that the game was too unchanged from its predecessor. The four reviewers of Electronic Gaming Monthly particularly complained at the inability to change the position of players during breaks in the play, and John Ricciardi summarized that "The addition of Club teams is nice, and the engine seems to have been polished up a bit, but otherwise this is pretty much the same game as last year with some annoying faults." Sega Saturn Magazine similarly judged that "there's little to justify purchasing this game if you already own the '97 edition. Sure, it has all the current Premiership sides and players, but at the end of the day, it plays virtually identically ..." GamePro similarly held that there weren't enough changes, and recommended holding out for the Saturn port of FIFA: Road to World Cup 98 instead. Next Generation was an exception, arguing that "Sega has made a wise decision to leave well enough alone with the third game in the series. Rather than making sweeping changes in gameplay, the designers have tweaked things a bit and stuffed enough little features into the game to make it a worthy update."

Some reviewers particularly criticized the lack of improvement in the goalie AI, though the greater racial accuracy of the player models as compared to Sega Worldwide Soccer '97 was praised. Also, despite the general criticism of the lack of improvements, critics for both Sega Saturn Magazine and GamePro felt that the graphics were good enough that no improvement was needed.

Notes

References

External links
 
 

1997 video games
Association football video games
Sega video games
Sega Saturn games
Video games developed in Japan
Windows games